Slawson Mountain is a mountain in Sullivan County, New York. It is located east of Willowemoc. Blue Hill is located east and Beech Mountain is located northwest of Slawson Mountain.

References

Mountains of Sullivan County, New York
Mountains of New York (state)